Recely Bluff is a snow and rock bluff on the northeast slope of Mount Siple on Siple Island. The bluff is 7 nautical miles (13 km) northeast of the summit of the mountain. It is mapped by United States Geological Survey (USGS) from surveys and U.S. Navy aerial photography, 1959–65. It was named by Advisory Committee on Antarctic Names (US-ACAN) for Frank J. Recely, Jr., United States Antarctic Research Program (USARP) ionospheric physicist at Byrd Station in 1965.

References 

Cliffs of Marie Byrd Land